Woodland Caribou Provincial Park is a provincial park in Northwestern Ontario, Canada, west of the municipality of Red Lake. It borders Atikaki Provincial Park and Nopiming Provincial Park in eastern Manitoba, and is made up of Canadian Shield and boreal forest.

Access to the park is via float plane or canoe. Portages connect many of the common canoe routes. The park has many archaeological sites containing many Ojibway pictographs.

See also
List of Ontario parks

References

External links

Woodland Caribou Park Information
Website

Provincial parks of Ontario
Parks in Kenora District
Pictographs in Canada
Protected areas established in 1983
1983 establishments in Ontario